Vilayur is a village and gram panchayat in Pattambi, Palakkad district in the state of Kerala, India.

Demographics
 India census, Vilayur had a population of 20,674 with 9,754 males and 10,920 females.

References

Villages in Palakkad district
Gram panchayats in Palakkad district